Retenez Moi...Ou Je Fais Un Malheur is a 1984 French comedy film directed by Michel Gerard and starring Jerry Lewis, Michel Blanc, and Charlotte de Turckheim. It was released on January 11, 1984 in France by the Gaumont Film Company.

Plot
Jerry Logan is a Las Vegas police officer who is visiting France to see his ex-wife, with whom he is still friendly.  She is remarried to Laurent Martin, who is a police officer in France.

The two men do not hit it off very well at first, but eventually they team up to solve the case of some art smugglers.

Cast
 Jerry Lewis as Jerry Logan
 Michel Blanc as Laurent Martin
 Charlotte de Turckheim as Marie-Christine Martin
 Michel Peyrelon as Franz
 Mylène Demongeot as The bench woman
 Jackie Sardou as The opera opener

Release
This was one of two films that Jerry Lewis made in the 1980s strictly for European release.  They have never been released in the US, although it has been given at least two tentative US release titles: To Catch a Cop and The Defective Detective.

Lewis, speaking about this film and Par où t'es rentré ? On t'a pas vu sortir, said that "as long as I have control [over distribution], you'll never see them in this country [United States]".

References

External links

1984 films
1984 comedy films
English-language French films
French comedy films
Gaumont Film Company films
1980s English-language films
1980s French films